The fourth Berlusconi government was the 60th government of Italy, in office from 8 May 2008 to 16 November 2011.
It was the fourth government led by Silvio Berlusconi, who then became the longest-serving Prime Minister of Italy of the Italian Republic (3340 days in office). The government was supported by a coalition between The People of Freedom (PdL) and the Northern League (LN), together with other smaller centre-right parties.

At its formation, the government included 22 ministers and 39 under-secretaries, for a total of 61 members. At the end of its term the cabinet was composed of 24 ministers, 4 deputy ministers and 39 under-secretaries, for a total of 67 members. With 1287 days of tenure, it was second in longevity only to Berlusconi's second government (1409 days from 2001 to 2005) in the history of the Italian Republic.

Formation

After the sudden fall of the second Prodi government on 24 January, the break-up of The Union coalition and the subsequent political crisis (which paved the way for a fresh general election in April 2008), Berlusconi, Gianfranco Fini and other party leaders finally agreed on 8 February 2008 to form a joint list named "The People of Freedom", allied with the Northern League of Umberto Bossi and with the Sicilian Movement for Autonomy of Raffaele Lombardo.

In the snap parliamentary elections held on 13/14 April 2008 this coalition won against Walter Veltroni's centre-left coalition in both houses of the Italian Parliament.

Berlusconi and his ministers were sworn in on 8 May 2008.

Fall

On 10 October the Chamber of Deputies rejected the law on the budget of the State proposed by the government. As a result of this event Berlusconi moved for a confidence vote in the Chamber on 14 October, he won the vote with just 316 votes to 310, minimum required to retain a majority. An increasing number of Deputies continued to cross the floor and join the opposition and on 8 November the Chamber approved the law on the budget of the State previously rejected but with only 308 votes, while opposition parties didn't participate in the vote to highlight that Berlusconi lost his majority. Among other things, his perceived failure to tackle Italy's debt crisis with an estimated debt sum of €1.9 trillion ($2.6 trillion) has urged Berlusconi to leave office. The popularity of this decision was reflected in the fact that while he was resigning crowds sang the hallelujah portion of George Frederick Handel's "Messiah", complete with some vocal accompaniment; there was also dancing in the streets outside the Quirinal Palace, the official residence of the President of Italy, where Berlusconi went to tender his resignation.

The austerity package was passed, it will raise €59.8 billion in savings from spending cuts and tax raises, including freezing public-sector salaries until 2014 and gradually increasing the retirement age for women in the private sector from 60 in 2014 to 65 in 2026. The resignation also came at a difficult time for Berlusconi, as he was involved in numerous trials for corruption, fraud and sex offences. He was often found guilty in lower courts but used loopholes in Italy's legal system to evade incarceration.

Berlusconi had also failed to meet some of his pre-election promises and had failed to prevent economic decline and introduce serious reforms. Many believed that the problems and doubts over Berlusconi's leadership and his coalition were one of the factors that contributed to market anxieties over an imminent Italian financial disaster, which could have a potentially catastrophic effect on the 17-nation eurozone and the world economy. Many critics of Berlusconi accused him of using his power primarily to protect his own business ventures. Umberto Bossi, leader of the Northern League, a partner in Berlusconi's right-wing coalition, was quoted as informing reporters outside parliament, "We asked the prime minister to step aside."

CNN reported on 7 November that Berlusconi had previously denied the rumors that he was going to resign and had stated on his Facebook page that "The rumors of my resignation are groundless." On 12 November 2011, after a final meeting with his cabinet, Berlusconi met Italian president Giorgio Napolitano at the Quirinal Palace to tender his resignation. He announced this to the Italian public by telephone on one of his television channels. Italian news agency ANSA reported that Berlusconi had remarked to his aides that "This is something that deeply saddens me". Berlusconi conceded that he had lost his parliamentary majority and concluded that "things like who leads or who doesn't lead the government was less important than doing what is right for the country." Berlusconi issued a statement that he would not stand for office in Italy again after the budget defeat. In his resignation he was said to have also mentioned "eight traitors", former allies who had abstained.

Investiture votes

Party breakdown

Beginning of term

Ministers

Ministers and other members
 The People of Freedom (PdL): Prime minister, 17 ministers, 30 undersecretaries
 Forza Italia (FI): Prime minister, 12 ministers, 17 undersecretaries
 National Alliance (AN): 4 ministers, 8 undersecretaries
 Christian Democracy for the Autonomies (DCA): 1 minister
 Liberal Populars (PL): 1 undersecretary
 Independents: 4 undersecretaries
 Northern League (LN): 4 ministers, 5 undersecretaries
 Movement for Autonomy (MpA): 2 undersecretaries
 Christian Democracy (DC): 1 undersecretary
 Independents: 1 undersecretary

End of term

Ministers

Ministers and other members
 The People of Freedom (PdL): Prime minister, 18 ministers, 24 undersecretaries
 Northern League (LN): 3 ministers, 1 deputy minister, 4 undersecretaries
 People and Territory (PT): 1 minister, 1 deputy minister, 2 undersecretaries
The Populars of Italy Tomorrow (PID): 1 minister
Popular Action (AP): 1 deputy minister
Movement of National Responsibility (MRN): 1 undersecretary
La Discussione: 1 undersecretary
 Independents: 1 minister, 2 undersecretaries
 Republicans-Actionists (RA): 1 deputy minister
 Great South (GS): 2 undersecretaries
 Christian Democracy (DC): 1 undersecretary
 The Right (Destra): 1 undersecretary
 National Cohesion (CN): 1 undersecretary

Council of Ministers

Composition

References

External links
Italian Government - Berlusconi IV Cabinet

Berlusconi, 4
Silvio Berlusconi
2008 establishments in Italy
2011 disestablishments in Italy
Cabinets established in 2008
Cabinets disestablished in 2011